R527 road may refer to:
 R527 road (Ireland)
 R527 (South Africa)